The Reform Party (or Mormon Reform Party) was an American political party formed by Joseph Smith in 1843, before he launched his campaign for President. After the Mormon exodus to Utah, they switched their support to the People's Party.

References

1843 establishments in the United States
Christian political parties in the United States
Defunct political parties in the United States
Joseph Smith
Latter Day Saint organizations
History of the Latter Day Saint movement
Political parties established in 1843
Political parties with year of disestablishment missing
Mormonism and politics